Hypsoblennius striatus, commonly known as the striated blenny, is a species of combtooth blenny found in coral reefs in the eastern-central Pacific Ocean, around Costa Rica and Panama.  This species grows to a length of  TL.

References

striatus
Fish described in 1876